The 1979 Central Fidelity Banks International was a women's singles tennis tournament played on indoor carpet courts at the Robins Center in Richmond, Virginia in the United States. The event was part of the AAA category of the 1979 Colgate Series. It was the inaugural edition of the tournament and was held from August 13 through August 19, 1979. First-seeded Martina Navratilova won the singles title and earned $20,000 first-prize money.

Finals

Singles
 Martina Navratilova defeated  Kathy Jordan 6–1, 6–3
 It was Navratilova's 7th singles title of the year and the 31st of her career.

Doubles
 Betty Stöve /  Wendy Turnbull defeated  Billie Jean King /  Martina Navratilova 6–1, 6–4

Prize money

Notes

References

External links
 International Tennis Federation (ITF) tournament edition details
  Women's Tennis Association (WTA) tournament edition details

Central Fidelity Banks International
Central Fidelity Banks International
Central Fidelity Banks International
Central Fidelity Banks International
Central Fidelity Banks International